Mount Lady Macdonald is a mountain located within Bow Valley Provincial Park in the Bow River valley at the Town of Canmore, which is located just east of Banff National Park, Alberta, Canada.

The mountain was named in 1886 after Susan Agnes Macdonald, wife of Sir John A. Macdonald, the first Prime Minister of Canada. The Macdonalds travelled on the new national railway through the Canadian Rockies in 1886 on their way to Vancouver.

Hikers may hike a trail that begins in Cougar Creek and continues to a helipad just short of the knife's edge ridge that leads to the top of the mountain.

Geology
It is composed of sedimentary rock laid down from the Precambrian to Jurassic periods. Formed in shallow seas, this sedimentary rock was pushed east and over the top of younger rock during the Laramide orogeny.

Climate
Based on the Köppen climate classification, it is located in a subarctic climate with cold, snowy winters, and mild summers.

See also
Geology of Alberta

References

Two-thousanders of Alberta
John A. Macdonald
Mountains of Banff National Park